Georgios Demosthenes Savalas (December 5, 1924 – October 2, 1985) was an American film and television actor. He was the younger brother of actor Telly Savalas, with whom he acted in the popular 1970s TV crime series Kojak.

Early life
Born in The Bronx, New York City to immigrants from Greece, he was one of five children: brothers Aristotelis (Telly), Gus and Ted; and sister Katherine.

He attended Holy Cross Institute in Connecticut and Mineola High School (Long Island). He served in the Pacific War as a United States Navy gunner but also acted, produced and directed stage performances on military bases. He studied drama at Columbia University.

Career
Starting out, Savalas worked many jobs, including driving a taxi and waiting tables. Although known primarily as a TV actor, Savalas was originally a stage actor and acting instructor. He taught at the Coliseum Studios for five years. He appeared in off-Broadway productions such as Death of a Salesman and Arms and Man while working with his father in two businesses: a hotel and a heating and air-conditioning company.

He is best known for his role as Sergeant Stavros on the TV series Kojak, which starred his brother Telly. For the first two seasons, Savalas was credited as "Demosthenes" on screen so as not to create confusion between himself and his brother, although both men were easily distinguishable by sight (George having a full head of hair while Telly shaved his head). George Savalas, under his real name, also received a Production Associate credit during the first season and a Production Assistant credit for the second season.

He appeared in several films such as The Slender Thread (1965), Genghis Khan (1965) and Kelly's Heroes (1970),  — all of which also featured his brother Telly. In the mid-1970s, he appeared in adverts in the United Kingdom for the Wimpy Bar chain.

In his later years, George recorded a popular Greek-language record and toured with his band, appearing at such venues as Carnegie Hall. He returned to the stage, appearing in a number of off-Broadway productions before illness forced him to retire.

Personal life
Savalas had six children: sons Nicholas George, Leonidas George, and Constantine George with his first wife; and sons Gregory George and Matthew George, and daughter Militza with his second wife, Robin. Later in life he resided in Reseda, California. He died of leukemia, aged 60 (misreported as 58 at the time), in Los Angeles.

Filmography

Film

Television

References

External links
 

1924 births
1985 deaths
American male film actors
United States Navy personnel of World War II
American male television actors
Columbia University alumni
Deaths from cancer in California
Deaths from leukemia
American people of Greek descent
United States Navy sailors
Burials at Forest Lawn Memorial Park (Hollywood Hills)
20th-century American male actors
People from Reseda, Los Angeles
Male actors from New York City
Military personnel from New York City